Vesyoloye is a rural locality (a selo) in Nizhneshilovsky Rural Okrug under the administrative jurisdiction of Adlersky City District of the City of Sochi. Population: 4,100 (2002 est.).

Etymology
The locality's name in Russian means "cheerful" and was given due to its beautiful and "cheerful-looking" environs.

Geography
The Psou River divides Vesyoloye with Abkhazia and traffic between Russian and Abkhaziais regulated by the Psou border control center. Vesyoloye stands on the M27 Highway which terminates at the Russian-Abkhazian border.

Science and culture
Vesyoloye is notable for its Research Institute of Medical Primatology, established in 1927.

In 2008, an ethnographic museum opened in Vesyoloye, containing exhibits of archaic materials which various ethnic groups (Russians, Armenians, Adyghe, Georgians) in the region used.

References

Rural localities in Krasnodar Krai
Sochi
Black Sea Governorate
Georgia (country)–Russia border crossings